The rowing events of the 1963 Mediterranean Games were held at Lago di Patria near Naples, Italy.

Medalists

Medal table

References
1963 Mediterranean Games report at the International Committee of Mediterranean Games (CIJM) website
List of Olympians who won medals at the Mediterranean Games at Olympedia.org

Mediterranean Games
Sports at the 1963 Mediterranean Games
1963